The SS-Ehrendolch ("SS honour dagger") was considered an honour weapon of the SS of the Nazi Party (NSDAP). In addition to this dagger there was also the SS Honour Ring and SS Honour Sword. The awarding ceremony was conducted according to strict rules developed by Heinrich Himmler.

Introduction and ceremony
This honour weapon was introduced in December 1933, following analogous traditions in the army, air force and navy. The awarding ceremony took place on November 9, during the final introduction of the SS-men in the Allgemeine SS, SS-Totenkopfverbände units and SS-Verfügungstruppe (later known as the Waffen-SS) every year.

The SS dagger was an official sidearm of the SS-dress uniform used by all full members of the SS. Production of these honour daggers was suspended in 1940.

Appearance and design

The design of the weapon was based on the 16th-century Swiss dagger. The center of the wide and spear-pointed and 33 cm long blade has a very pronounced rib. Along the longer axis of the blade the slogan of the SS "Meine Ehre heißt Treue" (My honour is loyalty) was etched.

The cross-guard and pommel were nickel-plated; the handle was black, inlaid with the silver NSDAP eagle and the SS symbol. The metal scabbard was covered in black gloss lacquer with silver-plated chape and mount. The SS dagger was introduced in 1933 and there are three distinctive versions available, depending on the year of manufacturing.

 Early production: 1933-1935: Manufacturer's logo, black burnished ebony handle, hilt with Roman numerals (I-Munich, II-Dresden, III-Berlin);
 Middle production: 1936-1938: Manufacturer's log with RZM code (double labeling), scabbard burnished or painted black, no Roman numerals on the guard;
 Late Production: 1938-1942: Only with RZM code, scabbard painted black, eagle insignia on handle usually made of aluminium.

Design for the "old fighters"
On June 21, 1936, another variant of the dagger was introduced, which was awarded only to those SS officers and NCOs who had joined the SS before 1933. This dagger was identical to the 1933 model, but the scabbard was fitted with a chain made of rectangular plaques adorned with skulls and SS runes and an additional silver fitting with swastika motif.

High-ranking SS leaders were presented a special dagger bearing the inscription In herzlicher Kameradschaft, H. Himmler ("In warm camaraderie, H. Himmler"). There were numerous variants of this dagger, which were handed to the recipients by Heinrich Himmler. These gift daggers were identical to the general-issue daggers, but were made of top quality materials and had gilded inscriptions. They were and still are considered a rarity due to the low number issued.

Carrying method
The SS honour daggers were usually worn with black SS uniform. According to Himmler, every SS member was obliged to use the dagger against anyone who had violated the honour of the SS or offended the honour or the family of the SS member. In November 1935, Himmler issued a decree stating that "every SS man has the right and duty to defend his honour with the weapon."

As of February 15, 1943 all officers of the Waffen-SS were entitled to wear this dagger also with the field-gray dress uniforms. For these occasions, the dagger was fitted with a tassle and sword knot made of aluminium lace, similar to one used by Wehrmacht officers.

SA-Dienstdolch

A SA-Dienstdolch ("SA service dagger") of similar appearance and design existed for the Sturmabteilung (the Nazi Party's original paramilitary wing) members. Along the longer axis of the blade the slogan "Alles für Deutschland" (Everything for Germany) was etched.

In 1934, Ernst Röhm introduced an SA-Erhrendolch ("SA honorary dagger") based on the SS model, with the inscription In herzlicher Kameradschaft, Ernst Röhm ("In warm camaraderie, Ernst Röhm").  Following the Long Knives Night, SA members awarded with this dagger were ordered to remove Röhm's name from it.

References

 Heinz Höhne : The Order of the Death's Head. The History of the SS. Weltbildverlag, 1992, p. 140.
 

Nazi SS
Daggers